The Fellowship of Australian Writers (FAW) was established in Sydney in 1928, with the aim of bringing writers together and promoting their interests. The organisation played a key role in the establishment of the Australian Society of Authors in 1963, a national body and now the main professional organisation in Australia for writers of literary works.

As of 2018, the following state-based independent organisations carried the name: Fellowship of Australian Writers NSW Inc. (a continuation of the original), Fellowship of Australian Writers Queensland, Fellowship of Australian Writers Tasmania, Fellowship of Australian Writers (VIC) Inc., and the Fellowship of Australian Writers (WA) Inc., most of which were founded in the 1930s.

History
Various claims have been made about its origin, but it seems that poet, Mary Gilmore, was encouraged by Roderic Quinn, and helped by Lucy Cassidy (wife of poet R.J. Cassidy), to hold a meeting of writers, at which a president, John Le Gay Brereton was elected.

It was initially a Sydney-based organisation, but gradually spread to other states, with Victoria and Western Australia being the first. In 1955 a federal council was created, with the national president rotating between the state presidents.

Early prominent members include: in New South Wales, Flora Eldershaw, Marjorie Barnard, Frank Dalby Davison, Dymphna Cusack, Miles Franklin and T. Inglis Moore; in Victoria, Nettie Palmer; and in Western Australia, Henrietta Drake-Brockman and Katharine Susannah Prichard.

The FAW was, with ex-Prime Minister Jim Scullin, largely responsible for a trebling of the Commonwealth Literary Fund's budget in 1939.

Australian Authors' Week
In 1935 the Fellowship organised an Authors' Week to, in the words of their press release, "encourage the development of our national literature, especially by bringing the work of our authors before the general public and schools". The week took place from 8 to 13 April and was held at Farmers' Blaxland Galleries. Events included personal appearances by authors, display of Australian books, dramatisations from Australian works, lectures by writers, radio broadcasts and an authors' ball.

The Week was prompted by a longstanding desire of the Fellowship to strengthen the place of Australian literature in Australian society, and it was believed that a way to do this was to encourage a closer dialogue between authors and their audience. The week was preceded by significant promotion and communication to the community primarily through newspapers and magazines. An editorial written in The Telegraph during the week commented on the popularity of Ion Idriess and suggested that:

Therein is cause to hope that ere long the appreciation for Australian writings will grow and widen to embrace the works of many others who, with a growing confidence in ultimate success, are continually and obscurely working to give Australians a literature which they may call their own.

The events of the week were mostly held during the day and hence primarily reached, or in some cases specifically targeted at, women, children and teachers. Indeed, it was generally accepted that women formed the bulk of the readership. Norman Lindsay, for example, wrote that "My personal opinion is that the average woman reads much better stuff than the average man". In his Authors' Week talk, Frank Dalby Davison said that "many people preferred yelling themselves hoarse at a test match or racecourse to reading a book by a cultured author".

Overall, the Week was deemed a success, with Marjorie Barnard writing that they'd received "a good deal of publicity" and were "pretty satisfied with the effort".

Awards

Historical
The FAW Patricia Weickhardt Award to an Aboriginal Writer was awarded from 1976 to 1991. Winners included David Unaipon (posthumously), Sally Morgan, Oodgeroo Noonuccal and Dick Roughsey.

In 1999, David Foster and Bruce Pascoe jointly won the FAW Australian Literature Award.

Current
The national, state and regional offices of the FAW offer a large number of literary competitions and awards. 

The Victorian chapter offers national awards known as the Fellowship of Australian Writers Victoria Inc. National Literary Awards, including: 
Christopher Brennan Award (formerly the Robert Frost Prize) for lifetime achievement in poetry
 Christina Stead Award
Melbourne University Publishing Award "an award for a non-fiction book first published in Australia, of sustained quality and distinction with an Australian theme", annual for over 30 years, sponsored by Melbourne University Press. 
Anne Elder Award for poetry
Barbara Ramsden Award for the editor as well as the author of "a book of quality writing in any field of literature"

The FAW Marjorie Barnard Short Story Award is a New South Wales award.

Presidents
Presidents of the Fellowship of Australian Writers include:

 Patsy Adam-Smith
 Bartlett Adamson
 John Le Gay Brereton (1928) inaugural
 Walter Francis John Jago (1931)
 Flora Eldershaw
 Donald Stuart (1974-1975)
 Hilarie Lindsay (1982–1984, 1992–1994)

Notes

References
 Bangsund, John (1984) "Scenes of editorial life: The awards dinner" originally published in The Society of Editors Newsletter, April 1984. Retrieved 2007-07-24
Dever, Maryanne (1992) "Courting the reader: Australian Authors' Week 1935" in Australian Cultural History, no. 11, pp. 100–110
 Fellowship of Australian Writers (Vic) – About the Fellowship. Retrieved 2007-07-24
 Fox, Len (editor) (1988). Dream at a Graveside: The History of the Fellowship of Australian Writers 1928 - 1988. Sydney: Fellowship of Australian Writers. .
 Wilde, W., Hooton, J. & Andrews, B (1994) The Oxford Companion of Australian Literature 2nd ed. South Melbourne, Oxford University Press

Further reading

Australian Writers' Resource: Writers' Groups (List all bodies in Australia))
1928 establishments in Australia
Australian writers' organisations
Arts organizations established in 1928